Fat Lip may refer to:
A slang term for a swollen lip
"Fat Lip", a 2001 song by Sum 41
"Fat Lip", a song by Robert Plant from his 1982 album Pictures at Eleven
"Fat Lip," a song by Rocket from the Crypt from their 1995 album Scream, Dracula, Scream!
Fatlip (born 1969), rapper and member of the group The Pharcyde